D. C. Cooper is the debut studio album released by D. C. Cooper.

Track listing
All songs written by D. C. Cooper/Alfred Koffler except where noted.
 "Dream" – 3:52
 "Easy Livin'" – 2:35 (Ken Hensley)
 "The Angel Comes" – 5:32 (Cooper/Tore Ostby)
 "Until the End" – 4:40 (Cooper/Ostby)
 "Within Yourself" – 3:40
 "Three Generations" – 4:26 (Cooper/Ostby)
 "Chained" (Instrumental) – 1:31 (Gunter Werno)
 "Freedom" – 6:18
 "Take Me In" – 3:49
 "Forgive Me" – 3:39
 "Whisper" – 4:11
 "The Union" – 8:57 (Cooper/Ostby)

Track 2 originally recorded by Uriah Heep on the album Demons and Wizards.

Credits
D. C. Cooper – vocals and backing vocals
Alfred Koffler – guitars
Tore Østby – guitars
Dennis Ward – bass guitar and backing vocals
Kosta Zafiriou – drums
Gunter Werno – keyboards
Sandy Campos – backing vocals
David Readman – backing vocals
Caroline Wolf – backing vocals

Production
Assistant Producer – Kosta Zafiriou
Mixing – Dennis Ward
Engineer – Dennis Ward

References

External links
Heavy Harmonies page

D. C. Cooper albums
1998 albums
Albums produced by Dennis Ward (musician)